In the Loop is a 2009 feature film directed by Armando Iannucci.

In the loop may also refer to:
In the Loop with iVillage, a 2006–08 American television series
 a Minnesota Public Radio show associated with Public Insight Network
 an episode of 2004 TV series Powers

See also
 
 The Loop (disambiguation)